Edgar Hull Jr. (February 20, 1904 – October 25, 1984), was a Louisiana physician. He was part of the founding faculty of the Louisiana State University Medical Center in New Orleans, and later served as Dean of the Louisiana State University School of Medicine at Shreveport (now the LSU Health Sciences Center Shreveport).

Hull died in Pascagoula, Mississippi, at the age of eighty, and was interred at Greenwood Cemetery in New Orleans.

References

1904 births
1984 deaths
Physicians from Louisiana
American surgeons
People from New Orleans
People from Pascagoula, Mississippi
People from Shreveport, Louisiana
People from DeSoto Parish, Louisiana
Louisiana State University alumni
Tulane University School of Medicine alumni
Louisiana State University faculty
Fulbright alumni